Project 2010 was a blueprint that United States Soccer Federation executives created in 1998 to ensure that the U.S. men's national soccer team could become a plausible contender to win the FIFA World Cup by 2010. The Q-Report, the jumping-off point for Project 2010, was written by Carlos Queiroz.

The $50 million development plan was started just before the start of the 1998 FIFA World Cup. While referred to less often in recent years, Project 2010 did propagate two programs which continued for some time to help produce professional standard talent: Generation Adidas (previously called Project-40 when sponsored by Nike) and U.S. Soccer's U-17 residency camp in Bradenton, Florida.  However, the residency camp closed in 2017 due to the proliferation of U.S. Development Academy programs.

References

Further reading
Davis, Noah (August 20, 2014) "How the United States can win the World Cup", Grantland

External links
Soccertimes article on the Q-Report.

United States men's national soccer team